Trimerina madizans is a species of shore flies, insects in the family Ephydridae.

Biology
The larvae are predators of spider eggs.

Distribution
Algeria, Austria, Belgium, Bulgaria, Czech Republic, Finland.

References

Ephydridae
Insects described in 1813
Diptera of Europe
Taxa named by Carl Fredrik Fallén